Gordon Ward is a judge.

Gordon Ward may also refer to:

Gordon Ward (philatelist), British philatelist
Gordon Ward (diver), British diver